The Nepean Raiders are a Junior ice hockey team from Nepean, Ontario, Canada.  They are a part of the Central Canada Hockey League.  The town of Nepean was granted expansion after the Cornwall Royals and the Hull Hawks left the CJHL for the Quebec Major Junior Hockey League. The Raiders started their operations in the Valley division of the Junior "B" League in 1966, switching over to the Central Junior Hockey League in 1972.

History
Nepean made the finals multiple times between 1972 and 1981. In the 1980s. Steve Yzerman and Darren Pang are still known for being the most-outstanding Raiders in the early era. The Raiders struggled in the 1980s and 1990s missing the playoffs multiple times, and set a season-record for the most-penalized CJHL team in 1995-96.

The Nepean Raiders came under new ownership with Gord Black in 1998. Black had previously attempted to purchase the Ottawa 67's. Black introduced a new logo, similar to the one used by the Prince Albert Raiders of the Western Hockey League, that was discontinued in 2014, with minor alterations. This logo was discontinued in 2009 when new ownership took over the Raiders organization, but still used as an alternate logo as the previous logo was revived.

In 2002-03, the Nepean Raiders broke a 22-year old championship appearance drought by winning the semi-finals against the Gloucester Rangers in 7 games. The Art Bogart Cup final was an easy task for the Raiders winning the series in 5 games against the Ottawa Junior Senators. At the Fred Page Cup in Cornwall, the Raiders finished 3rd and knocked off the hosts Cornwall Colts in the semi-finals, and lost the final to the Lennoxville Cougars.

The 2003-04 season saw 13 returning players poised to defend their championship season from before. The Raiders won a hard-fought series with the Gloucester Rangers, where game 7 was a nervous showdown where Nepean held on for a 1-0 win sending them to the Fred Page Cup in Valleyfield, Quebec. Nepean dropped the first 2 games to the Valleyfield Braves (4-0) and the Saint-Eustache Gladiateurs (6-4). Nepean and the Campbellton Tigers went into the final game winless, and Nepean won 3-1 to go to the semi-finals where they defeated Saint-Eustache 3-2 in double overtime. Nepean won the finals 4-0 against Valleyfield to earn a trip to the Royal Bank Cup in Grande Prairie, Alberta. Nepean won their first game 5-4 against the Nanaimo Clippers of the BCHL, where they rallied back from a 4-0 deficit to win in overtime. Nepean improved their record to 2-0 after winning 2-0 against the Kindersley Klippers of the SJHL. However, the Raiders dropped to 2-1 after losing to the hosts Grande Prairie Storm 4-2. Their final round robin contest came against the top-ranked Aurora Tigers of the OPJHL, losing 3-1. The same teams met in the semi-final, and Aurora won 7-2 thus making the Raiders the 5th different CCHL team to fail to make the national championship.

The 2004-05 season saw the Nepean Raiders finish strong, but the Art Bogart Cup finals saw an intense series against the Hawkesbury Hawks, who finished three spots behind the Raiders. Game 7 was played in a neutral venue, because the ice was removed from the Nepean Sportsplex, so game 7 was held at the Kanata Recreation Centre instead. A record was broke in this game for the fastest five goals in a playoff game as Hawkesbury won 6-1.

Nepean returned from a devastating finish from the 2004-05 season and used the 2005-06 season to rebuild. Although, the Raiders finished 3rd overall, they had to deal with the Brockville Braves, who were up 3-1 in the series and Nepean came back to force game 7. With the game tied 2-2, Raiders forward Matt Valois scored the winner with 5 seconds left in regulation to avoid sudden death overtime. The Pembroke Lumber Kings, who were ranked #1 nationally awaited to the Raiders, and this series saw the Lumber Kings up 3-1, and Nepean coming back to win in seven games. However, the Raiders re-matched against the Hawkesbury Hawks, but lost the series in 6 games.

The summer of 2006 saw head coach and general manager Chris Byrne leave the team to accept a coaching position with the Ottawa 67's. Afterwards, this led to Gord Black putting the team up for sale. A replacement was found with Archie Mulligan, who was once the coach for the Kanata Valley Lasers, who had an impressive resume with a 15-year stint with the Valley Lasers, and an appearance in two national championships. In the end, Nepean finished 4th overall and lose to the Pembroke Lumber Kings in the finals.

The 2007-08 season started off strangely, as Archie Mulligan left the team early in the season and scrambling for a replacement. The Raiders went through three coaches and lost the first quarter-finals series for the first time since 2000. Nepean came under new ownership over the summer with Arnie Vered and Brian Altshuller. CBC commentator Garry Galley was hired as head coach. Nepean finished 1st overall, and lost the finals to Pembroke in 5 games.

In December 2009, Garry Galley left the team abruptly over disagreements with upper management, leaving players demanding trades and wanting to be released.

The 2011-12 was a breakthrough for Nepean, as they finished 1st overall (second time under new ownership). However, they almost let the semi-final series slip out of their hands against the Pembroke Lumber Kings, who were up 3-1 and Nepean ultimately won the series in 7 games.

Nepean ended its nearly 20-year playoff streak in 2016 when the Raiders failed to make the playoffs since 1994-95. Goaltender Francois Marotte broke a league record for the most minutes played (3220) in one season.

Season-by-season record
Note: GP = Games Played, W = Wins, L = Losses, T = Ties, OTL = Overtime Losses, GF = Goals for, GA = Goals against

Fred Page Cup 
Eastern Canada Championships
MHL - QAAAJHL - CCHL - Host
Round robin play with 2nd vs 3rd in semi-final to advance against 1st in the finals.

Royal Bank Cup
CANADIAN NATIONAL CHAMPIONSHIPS
Dudley Hewitt Champions - Central, Fred Page Champions - Eastern, Western Canada Cup Champions - Western, Western Canada Cup - Runners Up and Host
Round robin play with top 4 in semi-final and winners to finals.

Championships
CJHL Bogart Cup Championships: 2003, 2004
Eastern Canadian Fred Page Cup Championships: 2004
CJAHL Royal Bank Cup Championships: None

Notable alumni
Adrian Aucoin
Jamie Baker
Andrew Calof
Jeff Chychrun
Grant Clitsome
Rob Dopson
Mike Eastwood
Mike Eaves
Stew Gavin
Ben Hutton
Andrew Mather
Mike Meeker
Tyler Moss
Darren Pang
Mark Paterson
Dan Ratushny
Keith Redmond
Joe Reekie
Travis Scott
Larry Skinner
Doug Smith
David Volpato
Aaron Ward
Jason York
Steve Yzerman
MacKenzie Weegar
Jonathan Zion

External links
Nepean Raiders Webpage

Central Canada Hockey League teams
Ice hockey teams in Ottawa
Ice hockey clubs established in 1966
1966 establishments in Ontario